The Register-Mail is an American daily newspaper published in Galesburg, Illinois. The paper was owned by the Pritchard family from 1896 to 1989, when it was sold to the Journal Star.  Copley Press bought both papers for $174.5 million. In 2007, GateHouse Media bought Copley's Illinois and Ohio papers.

In addition to the daily newspaper, GateHouse also publishes Knox County Neighbors, a weekly newspaper serving Knox County and the Galesburg area, and the Daily Review Atlas in neighboring Warren County.

See also
Omer N. Custer

References

External links 
 

Gannett publications
Newspapers published in Illinois
Knox County, Illinois
Galesburg, Illinois